Pierre Schild (1897–1968) was a Russian Empire-born art director known for his work in French and Spanish cinema. Born Lakka Schildknecht, he left Russia following the October Revolution in 1917. Following the German invasion of France in 1940 he emigrated to Spain.

Selected filmography
 Michel Strogoff (1926)
 Napoleon (1927)
 A Foolish Maiden (1929)
 Nights of Princes (1930)
 The Perfume of the Lady in Black (1931)
 Queen of the Night (1931)
 Under the Leather Helmet (1932)
 To Be Loved (1933)
 The Scandal (1934)
 Youth (1934)
 Return to Paradise (1935)
 Whirlpool of Desire (1935)
 Merchant of Love (1935)
 A Legionnaire (1936)
 The Volga Boatman (1936)
 Josette (1937)
 Barnabé (1938)
 Hercule (1938)
 Ernest the Rebel (1938)
 Rail Pirates (1938)
 Three from St Cyr (1939)
 Angelica (1939)
 The Millions of Polichinela (1941)
 Thirsty Land (1945)
 A Cuban in Spain (1951)

References

Bibliography
 Bentley, Bernard. A Companion to Spanish Cinema. Boydell & Brewer 2008.

External links

1897 births
1968 deaths
French cinematographers
Mass media people from Saint Petersburg
White Russian emigrants to France
French emigrants to Spain